Hå is a municipality in Rogaland county, Norway. It is the southernmost municipality in the traditional district of Jæren. The administrative centre of the municipality is the village of Varhaug. Other villages in Hå include Brusand, Hæen, Nærbø, Obrestad, Ogna, Sirevåg, and Vigrestad.

The  municipality is the 281st largest by area out of the 356 municipalities in Norway. Hå is the 67th most populous municipality in Norway with a population of 19,296.

General information

{{Historical populations
|footnote = Source: Statistics Norway.
|shading = off
|align = left
|1971|10607
|1981|12327
|1991|13022
|2001|14017
|2011|16822
|2020|18991
}}
The parish of Haa was established as a municipality on 1 January 1838 (see formannskapsdistrikt law). In 1894, the municipality of Haa was dissolved and divided into two new municipalities: Nærbø (population: 1,806) and Varhaug (population: 1,801). During the 1960s, there were many municipal mergers across Norway due to the work of the Schei Committee. On 1 January 1964, the municipality of Hå was recreated by merging of the neighboring municipalities of Nærbø (population: 3,926), Varhaug (population: 3,454), and Ogna (population: 1,470).  In local politics, the divisions between the three previous municipalities are very visible.

Name
The municipality is named after the old Hå'' farm where the local church priest's parsonage was located. The meaning of the name is unknown. The river running past this farm is similarly named the Hååna, meaning the "Hå river". It is not known if the river is named after the farm or vice versa.

Coat of arms
The coat of arms was granted on 5 July 1991. The arms are black with a silver/white winch in the centre. It is a special type of winch that has historically been used in this area to remove stones from the many farm fields. The arms were chosen to symbolize the hard living on the rocky soils of the municipality.

Churches
The Church of Norway has three parishes within the municipality of Hå. It is part of the Jæren prosti (deanery) in the Diocese of Stavanger.

Government
All municipalities in Norway, including Hå, are responsible for primary education (through 10th grade), outpatient health services, senior citizen services, unemployment and other social services, zoning, economic development, and municipal roads. The municipality is governed by a municipal council of elected representatives, which in turn elect a mayor.  The municipality falls under the Sør-Rogaland District Court and the Gulating Court of Appeal.

Municipal council
The municipal council of Hå is made up of 33 representatives that are elected to four year terms. Currently, the party breakdown is as follows:

Geography
Hå municipality is located on the southwestern shore of Norway, along the North Sea. The municipality is located mostly in the very flat, coastal Jæren district. The southeastern part of the municipality begins to get a little hilly and rocky and it marks the border of the Dalane district (located to the south and east). Much of the land in Hå is used for agriculture because of its flat landscape. The river Hååna runs through the municipality. The shoreline of the municipality is marked by the Kvassheim Lighthouse and Obrestad Lighthouse.

Settlements

Weather
Hå has a temperate oceanic climate (Cfb), also known as marine west coast climate. The average date for the last overnight freeze (low below ) in spring is 16 April and average date for first freeze in autumn is 10 November giving a frost-free season of 207 days (1981-2010 average).

Transportation
The Sørlandet Line runs through the municipality, making several stops. The stations in Hå include Brusand Station, Nærbø Station, Ogna Station, Sirevåg Station, Varhaug Station, and Vigrestad Station.

Notable people 

 Jacob Rasch (1669 in Ogna – 1737) rector of Christiania Cathedral School, 1706 to 1737
 Sven Aarrestad (1850 in Varhaug – 1942) writer, politician and leader in the Norwegian temperance movement
 Tor Obrestad (1938 in Hå – 2020) a Norwegian novelist, poet and documentary writer
 Gunnar Torvund (1948 in Nærbø – 2019) a Norwegian sculptor
 Kjell Arild Pollestad (born 1949 in Hå) author, theologian, philologist and Dominican priest
 Magnus Matningsdal (born 1951 in Hå) a judge and a Supreme Court Justice from 1997
 Helge Torvund (born 1951 in Hå) a psychologist, poet, literary critic and children's writer
 Geir Pollestad (born 1978 in Høyland) a politician and Govt. minister
 Vidar Nisja (born 1986 in Vigrestad) a Norwegian football midfielder with 324 club caps

References

External links

 
 
 
 Municipal fact sheet from Statistics Norway 

 
Municipalities of Rogaland
Jæren
1838 establishments in Norway
1894 disestablishments in Norway
1964 establishments in Norway